is an anime spin-off of Tenchi Muyo! Ryo-Ohki. It first appeared on NTV on April 3, 2002 before the show ended on September 25, 2002.

References 

2002 Japanese television seasons
GXP